Colin McLocklan is an English retired professional Association football forward who played two seasons in the North American Soccer League and at least one in the American Soccer League.

In 1977, he played for the Connecticut Bicentennials of the North American Soccer League. He signed with the Chicago Sting for the 1978 season. He played in the game home and away against Cuba. Touring the  Caribbean's playing against  Haiti national team Martinique national team  The Barbados national team . Before ending the preseason tour with a friendly against New York Cosmos  is  In 1979, he moved to the Indianapolis Daredevils of the American Soccer League.

He played for North Ferriby united  in the Yorkshire league scoring 177 goals before going to  America to play in the North American soccer league.

He played for Goole town in the  Northern Premier League

He went on to  Player manager of Bridlington  Trinity and Winterton Rangers in the Northern counties league

He played cricket for Hull C.C. in the Yorkshire league from the early 70s before leaving Goole and to play for Sheffield United and York also in the Yorkshire league before retiring in 2001 season

He played squash for Hull and East Riding in Hull and District and Yorkshire league

He is now the husband of the manager of the social work department at the Hull university of Hull. He lives with his wife at The university Lawns, Cottingham which supports student living at the halls for Hull University. He works for Scunthorpe United scouting  talented academy players

References

External links
NASL stats

1952 births
Living people
Footballers from Kingston upon Hull
American Soccer League (1933–1983) players
Connecticut Bicentennials players
Chicago Sting (NASL) players
English footballers
English expatriate footballers
Indianapolis Daredevils players
North American Soccer League (1968–1984) players
Association football forwards
English expatriate sportspeople in the United States
Expatriate soccer players in the United States